Zhan Ruoshui (1466–1560), was a Chinese philosopher, educator and a Confucian scholar.

Biography
Zhan was born in Zengcheng, Guangdong. He was appointed the president of Nanjing Guozijian (南京國子監, the Imperial Nanjing University) in 1524. He was later appointed the Minister of Rites (禮部, which mainly administers national ceremony, sacrifice, imperial examination, education, diplomacy, etc.), Minister of Personnel, and then Minister of War at Nanjing of the Ming dynasty.

As a scholar, Zhan is famous for mind theory. He was also a famous educator. In his life he founded and jointly founded more than 40 Shuyuan (書院, Confucian academies).

Zhan was a lifelong friend of the philosopher, general, and administrator Wang Yangming.  He shared an appreciation of Lu Xiangshan idealism (xinxue), Daoism, and Buddhism with Wang, although their intellectual paths ultimately diverged.

References

Cantonese philosophers
Ming dynasty philosophers
16th-century Chinese philosophers
Chinese Confucianists
Educators from Guangdong
1466 births
1560 deaths
Politicians from Guangzhou
Ming dynasty politicians
Philosophers from Guangdong